I.Am.Gia is an Australian fashion clothing brand.

History 
I.Am.Gia was co-founded by Alana Pallister with her sister Stevie Cox in May 2017. The name comes from the supermodel Gia Carangi. The idea of the brand was formulated around a fictional character based on the Instagram "It Girl."

I.Am.Gia initially received attention in the fashion industry when American model Bella Hadid was photographed wearing the brand's clothing during a Paris Fashion Week and due to its use of the Instagram app for promotion.

In the media 
The brand has been worn by models such as Bella Hadid, Emily Ratajkowski, Selena Gomez, Kaia Gerber, Romee Strijd, Ariana Grande, Jourdan Dunn, and reality television personality Kylie Jenner. The brand has had a 60% growth since its launch.

References 

Clothing brands of Australia
2017 establishments in Australia